Prestige refers to a good reputation or high esteem; in earlier usage, prestige meant "showiness". (19th c.)

Prestige may also refer to:

Arts, entertainment and media

Films
Prestige (film), a 1932 American film directed by Tay Garnett: woman travels to French Indochina to meet up with husband 
The Prestige (film), a 2006 American thriller directed by Christopher Nolan

Music
Prestige Records, American jazz record label
Prestige (Daddy Yankee album), a 2012 album by Daddy Yankee
 The Prestige (album)

Other uses in arts, entertainment, and media
 Prestige (magazine), a Lebanese French-language women's fashion quarterly
Prestige, the final portion of a magic trick, typically a showy flourish (17th c.)
The Prestige, 1995 novel by Christopher Priest

Brands and enterprises
Prestige (beer), a Haitian lager
 Citi Prestige, a premium Citibank credit card
Ibanez RG Prestige, a brand of guitars manufactured by Ibanez
Plaxton Prestige, a single-deck bus body built by Plaxton
Prestige Brands, an American manufacturer of personal care and home cleaning products
Prestige group, real estate developer in India
TTK Prestige, an Indian manufacturer of pressure cookers and other kitchen appliances.

Horse and greyhound races
Prestige (greyhounds), a greyhound racing competition
Prestige Novices' Hurdle, a Grade 2 National Hunt hurdle race in Great Britain
Prestige Stakes, a thoroughbred horse race in Great Britain

People
George Leonard Prestige (1889-1955), English theologian

Ships
Prestige (oil tanker), oil tanker
MSC Prestige, a container ship
USS Prestige, various American ships

Other uses
 Prestige (horse)
 Prestige (sociolinguistics), esteem in which languages or dialects are held
Prestige Elite, typeface
Prestige format, square-bound printing format for some comic books
Prestige oil spill, caused by the oil tanker's sinking in Spanish waters in 2002
Dual strategies theory, prestige as one of the two strategies for gaining status in human social hierarchies

See also
 Select (disambiguation)